Centro Desportivo Olímpico - Estádio is a multi-purpose stadium in Taipa, Macau, China. It was formerly named Estádio Campo Desportivo before the reconstruction of the stadium had been completed.

The Olympic Sports Center is the largest sporting complex in Macau. It is more often known as the Macau Olympic Complex Stadium since it is the largest facility of the complex. The complex comprises a stadium - a grass pitch (105 x 68 m) surrounded by an 8-lane athletic track and a long jump area, a 900-seated indoor stadium, a hockey centre, a practicing track and several tennis courts. In general, it is used mostly for football matches and athletics.

2005 reconstruction
The stadium has been under major overhaul including the reconstruction of the East and West Stand in order to increase its capacity for the 2005 East Asian Games. Prior to reconstruction the West Stand was the only part of the stadium with a roof, with the rest of them being open-air. The renewed stadium now has a capacity of around 16,272.

Tenants
The stadium has become the home ground of the Macau football team since its completion and has been a major venue for local athletic and football competitions including the Liga de Elite.

Notable football matches
After reconstruction it has held several high-profiled friendly matches such as China  vs. Portugal  in 2002, Barcelona vs. Shenzhen in 2005, Manchester United vs. Shenzhen in 2007, Chelsea F.C. vs. Guangzhou Pharmaceutical, Southampton F.C. vs. Guangzhou R&F in 2019.

On 5 September 2018, AFC announced that the stadium was host the 2018 AFC Champions League quarter final second leg between China's Tianjin Quanjian and Japan's Kashima Antlers on September 18.

Notable Football Matches

Team

Club

See also
 Sport in Macau

References

External links
Stadium
y Google Maps

 

Football venues in Macau
Rugby union in Macau
Athletics (track and field) venues in Macau
Multi-purpose stadiums in Macau